Robert Horton may refer to:
 Robert Horton (actor) (1924–2016), American television actor
 Robert Horton (businessman) (1939–2011), British businessman
 Robert C. Horton (1926–2014), American mining engineer
 Robert Forman Horton (1855–1934), British Nonconformist divine
 Robert E. Horton (1875–1945), American hydrologist

See also
 Robert John Wilmot-Horton, 3rd Baronet (1784–1841), British politician